Tracy Brown-May (born 1967) is an American politician serving as a member of the Nevada Assembly from the 42nd district. She was appointed to the seat after incumbent Democrat Alexander Assefa resigned.

Early life and education 
Brown-May was born in Holyoke, Massachusetts and raised in Ware, Massachusetts. After graduating from Ware Junior Senior High School, she moved to Las Vegas. Brown-May earned an associate degree in political science and government from the College of Southern Nevada in 2015. She is enrolled as a student at Northeastern University.

Career 
From 1996 to 2001, Brown-May was the employee development manager of Sam's Town Hotel and Gambling Hall. In 2001, she joined Opportunity Village, a non-profit organization for adults with intellectual disabilities, as special assistant to the president and CEO. Since 2017, she has worked as the organization's director of advocacy and government relations chair.

References

External links
Legislator page

Living people
1967 births
Women state legislators in Nevada
Democratic Party members of the Nevada Assembly
21st-century American politicians
People from Holyoke, Massachusetts
People from Ware, Massachusetts
College of Southern Nevada alumni
21st-century American women politicians